Events in the year 2023 in Ethiopia.

Incumbents 

 President: Sahle-Work Zewde
 Prime Minister: Abiy Ahmed

Events

Ongoing 
 Demolitions of houses in Addis Ababa, killings, and bodily Injury.
 Ethnic violence in Konso
 Amhara genocide
 Ethnic violence against Amaro Koore
 Benishangul-Gumuz conflict
 Oromo conflict
 Denial of the Gurage and Wolayta ethnic groups to form constitutional regional statehood
 Tigray War
 COVID-19 pandemic in Ethiopia

January 
 11 January – 15 Amhara IDPs and civilians killed in Haro Kebele by Oromo Special Forces (regional forces).
 12 January –Ethiopian Security forces arrested and detained members of the Ethiopian Human Rights Council named, Bereket Daniel, Nahom Hussien, Daniel Tesfaye, and Bizuayehu Wendimu,  
 20 January – 98 civilians killed by Oromo Liberation Front (OLF)-Shane and Oromo gunmen in multiple Amhara villages in North Shewa, Amhara region. 155 people injured and 1930 houses damaged (set on fire).

February 
 3 February – Ethiopian prime minister Abiy Ahmed met with officials of the Tigray People's Liberation Front for the first time since the signing of a peace treaty in November.
 Early February — 3 to 8 people killed when police attacked the Ethiopian Orthodox Church in Addis Ababa.
 15 February — 50 ethnic Amhara killed by Oromo armed men in the Oromo region.
 25 February — The Murle ethnic militiamen from South Sudan crossed in to Ethiopia and  killed and injured civilians in Boy kebele of the Agnewak zone in Gambela. The Murle militiamen also killed and guns were seized.
 28 February — Police attacked civilians during the 127th Adwa Victory Celebrations and inside the religious congregation at the Saint George Church. At least one person shot by a security force. Reliefweb reported that the victim is an Amhara and a civics teacher at a high school,.

March 
 March 07 — UN's High Commissioner stated that there needs to be tangible progress on accountability for the ongoing conflict-related violations and abuses in the country. He also calls on the implementation of the report by his Office and the Ethiopian Human Rights Commission.
 March 08 — Human rights activist and journalist Meaza Mohammed received the 2023 International Women of Courage Award which was hosted by Department of State in Washington DC. 
 March 10 — Secretary of State Antony Blinken visited Ethiopia and announced new U.S. aid to "advance" vital steps for building peace and stability in the country.
 March 18 — Finance minister stated that minimum of USD20 billion is needed to rebuild the devastated northern part of Ethiopia which includes the Afar, Amhara and Tigray regions.

Scheduled

Birth

Deaths (non-violence related)

See also 

 Human rights in Ethiopia
 Timeline of the Tigray War

References 

 
Ethiopia
Ethiopia
2020s in Ethiopia
Years of the 21st century in Ethiopia